Ram Run (also Romanized as Ram Rūn; also known as Rameh Ran and Rameh Rūn) is a village in Barez Rural District, Manj District, Lordegan County, Chaharmahal and Bakhtiari Province, Iran. At the 2006 census, its population was 201, in 37 families.

References 

Populated places in Lordegan County